A cool warehouse or cold storage warehouse is a warehouse where perishable goods are stored and refrigerated. Products stored can be, amongst other things, food, especially meat, other agricultural products, pharmaceutical drugs, other chemicals and blood.

See also 
Cool store
2800 Polar Way

References

External links

Warehouses
Cooling technology
Food preservation